The 2020–21 season was the 113th season in the existence of Atalanta B.C. and the club's 10th consecutive season in the top flight of Italian football. In addition to the domestic league, Atalanta participated in this season's editions of the Coppa Italia and the UEFA Champions League. The season covered the period from 13 August 2020 to 30 June 2021.

Players

First-team squad

Transfers

In

Loans in

Out

Loans out

Pre-season and friendlies

Competitions

Overview

Serie A

League table

Results summary

Results by round

Matches
The league fixtures were announced on 2 September 2020.

Coppa Italia

UEFA Champions League

Group stage

The group stage draw was held on 1 October 2020.

Knockout phase

Round of 16
The draw for the round of 16 was held on 14 December 2020.

Statistics

Appearances and goals

|-
! colspan=14 style=background:#DCDCDC; text-align:center| Goalkeepers

|-
! colspan=14 style=background:#DCDCDC; text-align:center| Defenders

|-
! colspan=14 style=background:#DCDCDC; text-align:center| Midfielders

|-
! colspan=14 style=background:#DCDCDC; text-align:center| Forwards

|-
! colspan=14 style=background:#DCDCDC; text-align:center| Players transferred out during the season

Goalscorers

Notes

References

External links

Atalanta B.C. seasons
Atalanta
Atalanta